Judson Alyn Brewer, M.D., Ph.D., (born 1974) is an American psychiatrist, neuroscientist and New York Times best-selling author. He studies the neural mechanisms of mindfulness using standard and real-time fMRI, and has translated research findings into programs to treat addictions. Brewer founded MindSciences, Inc. (now known as DrJud), an app-based digital therapeutic treatment program for anxiety, overeating, and smoking. He is director of research and innovation at Brown University's Mindfulness Center and associate professor in behavioral and social sciences in the Brown School of Public Health, and in psychiatry at Brown's Warren Alpert Medical School.

Early life and education
Judson Brewer (born about 1974) is the son of Victor and Alice Brewer. As a boy he delivered papers for the Indianapolis News and received a college scholarship sponsored by that newspaper in 1992.  He attended Brebeuf Preparatory in Indianapolis and earned an A.B. in chemistry in 1996 at Princeton University. He earned his M.D. in 2004 from Washington University School of Medicine in St. Louis, where in 2002 he had also earned his Ph.D. in immunology, working in the laboratory of Louis J. Muglia. His dissertation was titled The Role of Glucocorticoids in Immune System Development.

Between 2005 and 2007 Brewer worked in the post-doctoral Neuroscience Research Training Program at the Yale School of Medicine. He was chief resident in 2007 at the Clinical Neuroscience Research Unit of the Connecticut Mental Health Center, and he had a research training fellowship in substance abuse at Yale. In 2008 Brewer completed his residency in psychiatry at the Yale School of Medicine. In 2009 he earned board certification in psychiatry from the American Board of Psychiatry and Neurology.

Career

Academia
In Brewer's early career he was an assistant professor in the Department of Psychiatry at Yale University School of Medicine, and also a research affiliate in the Department of Brain and Cognitive Sciences at the Massachusetts Institute of Technology. He served as director of research at the Center for Mindfulness of the University of Massachusetts Medical School prior to joining the faculty at the Mindfulness Center of Brown University as director of research and innovation.

Brewer began meditating to deal with stress while a graduate student at Washington University School of Medicine. In 2011 he and colleagues published a study reporting, "the brains of experienced meditators—those who have been meditating for at least 10 years—showed decreased activity in the areas linked to attention lapses, anxiety, attention-deficit hyperactivity disorder, schizophrenia, autism, and plaque buildup in Alzheimer disease. This effect was seen regardless of the type of meditation practiced. The areas in question comprise the default mode network, which consists of the medial prefrontal and posterior cingulate cortices."

Michael Pollan wrote that in 2012, Brewer, "using fMRI to study the brains of experienced meditators, noticed that their default-mode networks had also been quieted relative to those of novice meditators. It appears that, with the ego temporarily out of commission, the boundaries between self and world, subject and object, all dissolve. These are hallmarks of the mystical experience."

By 2013 Brewer's focus was on "neurobiological mechanisms underlying the interface between stress, mindfulness and the addictive process, and in developing effective means for the modulation of these processes to better treat substance use disorders." He was also developing measurements of mindfulness practice, using functional MRI methods with real-time feedback to examine effects of mindfulness-training on brain function and mental health.

In 2012, Brewer founded MindSciences, Inc. to create app-based digital therapeutics programs based on the mindfulness training and research he pursued in his lab at Yale University. The company's apps are built on his research and the experiences of thousands of users both in clinical trials and real-world use. The apps include: "Unwinding Anxiety" for anxiety and stress reduction, "Eat Right Now" for dysfunctional eating and "Craving To Quit" for smoking cessation. Clinical research from 2017 showed a 40% decrease in craving-related eating after two months of using the "Eat Right Now" app. A study on the "Craving To Quit" app found a mechanistic link between reductions in brain reactivity to smoking cues and reductions in cigarette smoking that were specific only to mindfulness training, compared to the National Cancer Institute's QuitGuide app. In 2019, MindSciences launched a portal. In 2019 and 2020, MindSciences won the "Health Value Award in Behavioral Health Management", an award "to recognize outstanding services, products, and programs across 34 categories spanning the healthcare industry".

Key teachings
Brewer uses Pandita's quote to illustrate the difference between dopamine secretions and joy: "In their quest for happiness, people mistake excitement of the mind for real happiness." He advises using curiosity as a hack to move the brain's attention away from anxiety and cravings.

Media appearances
Markham Heid of Time quoted Brewer's explanation of his research findings in 2014: "Basically, meditation helps your brain get out of its own way... It's mostly about being aware of your thoughts and not running after them in your mind." Brewer also had begun to focus on "how mindfulness practice can affect learning processes leading to positive habit change", translating research findings into clinical use, specifically with clinical trials of smoking cessation using neurofeedback with mindfulness. Sandra Gray of UMass Boston wrote of "the striking impact of mindfulness on people trying to quit smoking", describing his interview with Meghna Chakrabarti on WBUR's Radio Boston. Brewer had said, "It seems that in experienced meditators some of these regions [associated with the brain's default mode network] get pretty quiet when they are meditating. There's an activity change in the brain. There's a lot more work to be done, but it's probably letting go of some of these pathways that are laid down each time someone uses."

On 60 Minutes, Anderson Cooper featured his own experiences at a mindfulness meditation retreat and visited Brewer "to learn more about the cutting-edge brain imaging research he is conducting to confirm that mindfulness can be an effective treatment for addictions to everything from food to tobacco to opioids—even to electronic devices like cell phones."

In addition, Farrah Jarral of Al Jazeera noted in 2016 that traditional addiction treatments have a relapse rate of 70 percent, and she featured Brewer's research, describing him as "a psychiatrist who is using the power of the mind to overcome addiction". Fran Smith wrote in 2017, "In a head-to-head comparison, Brewer showed that mindfulness training was twice as effective as the gold-standard behavioral antismoking program."

Smith added:

When Amanda Lang of Bloomberg TV Canada asked Brewer why employers are interested in mindfulness, he said if employees can develop the wisdom to understand how they and their co-workers' minds work, it could help all work together in a much more seamless manner. When asked about the possible downsides, he did not offer any negatives associated with such a change, but he did mention the importance of working with a teacher or facilitator. Responding to a question from Kevin Kruse of Forbes about the "reward-based learning" model and the role of dopamine in the brain, Brewer said, "Dopamine, it seems, is there to help us learn things. So for example, when something novel happens, we get a spritz of dopamine in our nucleus accumbens. And when this process starts, we get habituated when we have the same thing happen over and over and over." He then described the practice of mindfulness:

Charlotte Liebman quoted Brewer's explanation of counter-productive self-criticism: "When we get caught up in self-referential thinking — the type that happens with rumination, worry, guilt or self-judgment — it activates self-referential brain networks... When we let go of that mental chatter and go easy on ourselves, these same brain regions quiet down." To achieve self-compassion, Brewer recommended using "any practice that helps us stay in the moment and notice what it feels like to get caught up. See how painful that is compared to being kind to ourselves." Brewer has also addressed the "empty your mind" misconception about meditation: "Meditation is not about emptying our minds or stopping our thoughts, which is impossible... It's about changing our relationships to our thoughts."

TED Talk
The subject of Brewer's 2015 TED Talk was "A simple way to break a bad habit". It was the fourth most popular TED talk of the year and as of 2019 had been viewed more than 16 million times.

Personal life
Brewer and his wife Mahri reside in Massachusetts.

Selected publications

Books

Apps 

 Eat Right Now®
 Unwinding Anxiety®
 Craving to Quit

Journal articles
Ludwig, V. U., Brown, K. W., Brewer, J. A., (2020) “Self-regulation without force: can awareness leverage reward to drive behavior change?” Perspectives on Psychological Science 15(6):1382-99.
Brewer, J. A., Roy, A. H., Deluty, A., Liu, T., Hoge, E. A., (2020) “Can Mindfulness Mechanistically Target Worry to Improve Sleep Disturbances? Theory and Study Protocol for App-Based Anxiety Program.” Health Psychology. 39(9): 776-84.
Roy, A. H., Druker, S., Hoge, E. A., Brewer, J. A., (2020) “Physician anxiety and burnout. Is mindfulness a solution? Symptom correlates and a pilot study of app-delivered mindfulness training,” JMIR mHealth uHealth 8(4):e15608.
Pbert, L., Druker, S., Crawford, S., Frisard, C., Trivedi, M., Osganian, S. K., Brewer, J. A., (2020) “Feasibility of a Smartphone App with Mindfulness Training for Adolescent Smoking Cessation: Craving to Quit (C2Q)-Teen” Mindfulness 11: 720–733.
Richey, J. A., Brewer, J. A., Sullivan-Toole, B. S., Strege, M. V., Kim-Spoon, J., White, S. W., Ollendick, T. H., (2019) “Sensitivity shift theory: A developmental model of positive affect and motivational deficits in social anxiety disorder” Clinical Psychology Review 72:101756.
Roos, C. R., Brewer, J. A., O’Malley, S. S., Garrison, K. A., (2019) “Baseline craving strength as a prognostic predictor of benefit from smartphone app-based mindfulness training for smoking cessation.”  Mindfulness 10(10): 2165-2171.
Janes, A.C., Datko, M., Roy, A., Barton, B., Druker, S., Neal, C., Ohashi, K., Benoit, H., van Lutterveld, R., Brewer, J. A., (2019) “Quitting starts in the brain: a randomized controlled trial of app-based mindfulness shows decreases in neural responses to smoking cues that predict reductions in smoking.” Neuropsychopharmacology 44:1631–1638

 van Lutterveld, R., Houlihan, S. D., Pal, P., Sacchet, M. D., McFarlane-Blake, C., Patel, P. R., Sullivan, J. S., Ossadtchi, A., Druker, S., Bauer, C., Brewer, J. A., (2017)"Source-space EEG neurofeedback links subjective experience with brain activity during effortless awareness meditation" NeuroImage 151(1): 117-27.

Garrison, K. M., Scheinost, D., Constable, R. T., Brewer, J. A. (2014) "Neural activity and functional connectivity of loving kindness meditation" Brain and Behavior 4(3): 337-47.

Garrison, K. M., Santoyo, J. F., Davis, J. H., Thornhill IV, T. A., Thompson, Kerr, C. E., Brewer, J. A. (2013) "Effortless awareness: using real-time neurofeedback to probe correlates of posterior cingulate cortex activity in meditators' self-report." Frontiers in Human Neuroscience 7: 440.

Elwafi, H. M., Witkiewitz, K., Mallik, S., Thornhill, T. A., Brewer, J. A., (2013) "Mechanisms of mindfulness training in smoking cessation: moderation of the relationship between craving and cigarette use." Drug and Alcohol Dependence 130(1-3): 222-29.

Popular media

See also
Addiction psychiatry
Addictive behavior
Anxiety disorder
Buddhist meditation
Clinical neuroscience
Research on meditation

References

External links
 
Mindfulness Center, Brown University

 
 
 
 
 

1974 births
Living people
Princeton University alumni
Washington University School of Medicine alumni
American psychiatrists
Brown University faculty
American neuroscientists
People from Indianapolis